Agnes Johanna Elisabeth van Stolk (1898-1980) was a Dutch artist.

Biography 
Stolk was born on 16 November 1898 in Hof van Delft. She attended the Vrije Academie voor Beeldende Kunsten (Free Academy of Visual Art) in the Hague. She studied with Berend Adrianus Bongers, Francis de Erdely, and Johan Tielens. Her work was included in the 1939 exhibition and sale Onze Kunst van Heden (Our Art of Today) at the Rijksmuseum in Amsterdam.

Stolk died on 11 August 1980 in Wassenaar.

References

1898 births
1980 deaths
People from Delft
20th-century Dutch women artists